Lordstown High School is a public high school in Lordstown, Ohio, United States. It is the only high school in the Lordstown Local School District. Their mascot is the Red Devils, and compete as a member of the Ohio High School Athletic Association and is a member of the Northeastern Athletic Conference.

Athletics 
Lordstown High School currently offers:

 Baseball
 Basketball
 Bowling
 Cross Country
 Cheerleading
 Soccer
 Softball
 Tennis
 Track & Field
 Volleyball

References

External links
 District website

High schools in Trumbull County, Ohio
Public high schools in Ohio